Future Rave (also known as FUTURE RAVE or FR) is a genre of EDM coined by deejay/producers David Guetta and Morten Breum. The sound is a dark yet electrifying blend of techno and progressive house. In 2022, the pair have gone on a tour under the name Future Rave. The style has been popularized by other EDM artists such as Hardwell.

History 
In 2019, French producer David Guetta and Danish producer Morten Breum paired together to produce some tracks. They produced several tracks together and later they would call this style Future Rave. The first two tracks produced in this style by the pair were  "Never Be Alone" with Aloe Blacc and an official remix of Avicii's "Heaven." In 2022, the pair went on a US Tour under the title Future Rave, including an appearance at EDC and started a residency at Hï Ibiza under the same title.

David Guetta comments on their collaboration in a Billboard interview: "MORTEN came with this sound, and it's so hard to find a new sound. Then I have more experience in making chords and melodies and structuring records, so it's been really interesting to be able to kind of complete each other. I think what we're doing doesn't sound like anyone else. It's really fresh and new and I'm so excited about it. DJs I play it for are excited about it too. I haven't been excited about dance music like this for a long time."

In 2022, after a 4-year hiatus, Hardwell came back to play the Ultra Music Festival and his set was described as Future Rave and Future Techno. He released the track Black Magic which has been described as "synth-packed, captivating track that immerses its listeners into the world of the world of techno." It is a "dark, almost mystical sounds interlocked with techno characteristics and...packed with epic, almost cinematic sounds.

Style and sound 
The sound is described as underground futuristic techno and trance arrangements layered in while also incorporating the ever-changing cutting edge sounds. According to Magnetic Mag "What sets future rave apart is a slight shift in syncopation, which makes all the difference.There is an added level of syncopation to the percussions which creates a slightly more mature and rolling groove which is interlaced with the same aggressively-programmed synth hits that propel the tracks forward. The sound pallets hasn't changed, but the timings and grooves have over corrected themselves back to the early rave days of the 90s and the sound is all the better for it."

The tracks also contain rolling, energetic grooves from the start to finish with long build ups and drops. They also contain euphoric vocals and anthemic breakdowns.

Future Rave brings the elements of both the EDM and underground scenes together, while keeping the cutting-edge sound ever-evolving. Future rave builds bridges between the energy and the hooks of EDM, the futuristic sounds of techno, and the emotion of trance and (future) house.

Examples 

 Dreams – David Guetta, MORTEN feat Lanie Gardner
 Never Be Alone – David Guetta, MORTEN feat Aloe Blacc
 Kill Me Slow – David Guetta & MORTEN
 Permanence – David Guetta & MORTEN
 You Can't Change Me – David Guetta & MORTEN feat Raye
 Element – David Guetta & MORTEN
 Black Magic – Hardwell
 Let's Rave, Make Love - Armin van Buuren and Shapov
 Meant to Be (Rave Edit) – JUSTUS
 Weight of the World (Club Mix) – Armin van Buuren featuring RBVLN
 Dark Space - Retrika and Alex Mueller
 Nyx - A. Jan

Artists 

David Guetta
Gabry Ponte
Hardwell
Justus
 LOUTON
 MORTEN
 Will Sparks

References 

Electronic dance music genres